KVDP may refer to:

 Kevin van der Perren
 KVDP (FM), a radio station (89.1 FM) licensed to Dry Prong, Louisiana, United States